The 2015 DFB-Pokal Final decided the winner of the 2014–15 DFB-Pokal, the 72nd season of Germany's premier football cup. It was played on 30 May 2015 at the Olympiastadion in Berlin.

Borussia Dortmund, runners-up in the previous final, faced VfL Wolfsburg, who won the game 3–1 to capture their first title, with all four goals in the first half.			
 
As winners, Wolfsburg played against Bayern Munich, champions of the 2014–15 Bundesliga, in the 2015 DFL-Supercup, winning in a penalty shoot-out. Wolfsburg also would have qualified for the group stage of the 2015–16 UEFA Europa League, although they had already qualified for the 2015–16 UEFA Champions League via their league position. Because of this, the sixth-placed team in the Bundesliga, Schalke 04, earned automatic qualification for the group stage of next year's edition of the UEFA Europa League, and the league's third qualifying round spot went to the team in seventh, Borussia Dortmund; this was the first season in which the cup runners-up would not have qualified for the Europa League if the cup winner had qualified for the Champions League via their league position.

Background
It was Dortmund's seventh final and they have a record of three victories (most recently against Bayern in 2012) and three defeats (most recently against the same opponents two years later). Wolfsburg's only prior appearance was in 1995, losing 0–3 to Borussia Mönchengladbach. Wolfsburg midfielder Junior Malanda died in a car accident in January 2015. In his honour, they wore shirts with his squad number 19 within a heart.

The game was Dortmund manager Jürgen Klopp's final match, after seven years in charge of the team.

Route to the final
The DFB-Pokal began with 64 teams in a single-elimination knockout cup competition. There were a total of five rounds leading up to the final. Teams were drawn against each other, and the winner after 90 minutes would advance. If still tied, 30 minutes of extra time was played. If the score was still level, a penalty shoot-out was used to determine the winner.

Note: In all results below, the score of the finalist is given first (H: home; A: away).

Borussia Dortmund

Borussia Dortmund, of the Bundesliga, started the tournament in the first round on 17 August 2014, playing away at 3. Liga club Stuttgarter Kickers, and winning 4–1 with goals by Henrikh Mkhitaryan, Pierre-Emerick Aubameyang (2) and Adrián Ramos. On 28 October, they played the second round away at FC St. Pauli of the 2. Bundesliga, winning 3–0 with goals from Ciro Immobile, Marco Reus and Shinji Kagawa. The third round on 3 March 2015 again had Dortmund travel, to third-tier Dynamo Dresden, where they won 2–0 from two goals by Immobile in the second half, after losing Reus to injury in the first half.

Dortmund's first home fixture of the tournament came in the quarter-finals on 7 April, against their first top-flight opponent, TSG 1899 Hoffenheim. They gained the lead when defender Neven Subotić volleyed from a corner kick, but within two minutes Kevin Volland equalised with his own volley. Shortly afterwards, Subotić's defensive error allowed Roberto Firmino to put Hoffenheim into the lead. In the second half, Aubameyang equalised for Dortmund, heading in Erik Durm's cross. The game went to extra time, in which Sebastian Kehl scored a long-range volleyed winner for Dortmund. On 28 April, Dortmund went to the Allianz Arena to face Bayern Munich in the semi-finals, a repeat of the last season's final. The hosts took the lead through Robert Lewandowski, whom they had signed from Dortmund in the summer, but Dortmund equalised with 15 minutes to play, Aubameyang finishing Mkhitaryan's cross. The game went to a penalty shootout, in which all four Bayern takers including goalkeeper Manuel Neuer missed, but Dortmund's İlkay Gündoğan and Kehl scored.

VfL Wolfsburg
VfL Wolfsburg, also of the Bundesliga, began in the first round away to 2. Bundesliga club SV Darmstadt 98 on 17 August. After a goalless draw, they won on penalties: Naldo missed their first attempt, but Maurice Exslager and Milan Ivana missed for the hosts. They then hosted a 4–1 win over second-tier 1. FC Heidenheim in the second round: despite conceding Marc Schnatterer's opener for the visitors, they replied with goals by Daniel Caligiuri, Bas Dost and Luiz Gustavo (2). In the third round on 4 March, they travelled to the Red Bull Arena where they defeated 2. Bundesliga club RB Leipzig 2–0, with a goal in either half from Caligiuri and Timm Klose.

In the quarter-finals on 7 April, Wolfsburg hosted their first top-flight opponent, SC Freiburg. In the second half, Caligiuri was fouled by Julian Schuster for a penalty, which Ricardo Rodríguez converted past Roman Bürki for the only goal of the game. They played away to third-tier DSC Arminia Bielefeld in the semi-finals 22 days later. Wolfsburg won 4–0, with two goals by Maximilian Arnold and further strikes by Luiz Gustavo and Ivan Perišić.

Match

Details

References

External links
 
 Match report at kicker.de 
 Match report at WorldFootball.net
 Match report at Fussballdaten.de 

Borussia Dortmund matches
VfL Wolfsburg matches
2014–15 in German football cups
2015
2015 in Berlin
May 2015 sports events in Germany
Football competitions in Berlin